Al Minhad Air Base (also just Minhad Air Base) is a military installation in the United Arab Emirates. It is currently the headquarters of the Australian Defence Force's Joint Task Force 633 and supports Australian operations in the Middle East.
The base was "a critical hub for Coalition/ISAF partners in Afghanistan, including the Australians, Dutch, Canadians, Brits and Kiwis."

Facilities

Foreign users

Several foreign countries allied to the United Arab Emirates are believed to have made use of Al Minhad Air Base since the early 2000s to support the logistics supply chain for their military operations in Afghanistan. Use of the Al Minhad Air Base is a sensitive matter for the Government of the United Arab Emirates, which imposes a diplomatic agreement stating that the militaries of foreign governments not advertise the host nation nor location of their operations in the United Arab Emirates due to "local sensitivities" about allowing a foreign military presence within its borders.

  - The Australian Defence Force (ADF) has used Al Minhad as their main transport and logistics hub in the Middle East since the withdrawal of Australian combat forces from Iraq in 2008. The RAAF had operated AP-3C Orions from the base from 2003 to support operations in the region, however it was not until 2008 that an agreement was signed allowing Australia to command its regional headquarters there. At Al Minhad, the ADF maintains a facility, which is named Camp Baird, and as part of the military intervention against the Islamic State of Iraq and the Levant has deployed Boeing F/A-18F Super Hornets, Boeing E-7A Wedgetails and Airbus KC-30As. During early 2015 the Boeing F/A-18F Super Hornets replaced the McDonnell Douglas F/A-18A Hornets.

  - The Canadian Forces operated a forward logistics support facility in the Middle East which they had codenamed Camp Mirage. It is widely believed that Camp Mirage was located at Al Minhad Air Base from its founding in fall 2001 until its closure in fall 2010 due to an unrelated disagreement over securing additional landing rights for UAE's civilian airlines at Canadian airports. The United States military relied on the UAE bases for assistance during the Gulf War and the recent conflict in Iraq.

  - The Armed forces of the Netherlands also have deployed assets here.

  - The New Zealand Defence Force have deployed assets here.

  - The British Armed Forces have operations at the base. No. 906 Expeditionary Air Wing RAF was stood up at the base on 15 January 2013. 906 Wing was an expansion of the RAF's presence; previously, prior to Christmas 2012, No. 6 Squadron RAF had exercised their Eurofighter Typhoons from the UAE. The base was being used extensively by the RAF during the Operation Pitting, the UK's evacuation of Kabul in 2021, with an Airbus KC2 Voyager used for long-haul back to RAF Brize Norton and the Boeing C-17A Globemaster and Lockheed C-130J Hercules operating between Kabul and Minhad Air Base.

References

 
 </ref>
  "The mission name Operation Troy was originally assigned to the NZDF Air Survelliance Task Unit prior to its deployment to the Middle East in 2003. On its return to New Zealand in 2003 the name was transferred to the NZDF Logistics Hub which remained in the Middle East to provide an essential logistics and transport hub" [developed mostly into support for Afghanistan activities]. 

 
 

United Arab Emirates Air Force bases
Overseas or abroad military installations